Wolfgang Robert Karl Adolf Ludwig Ferdinand Maria Dorasil (7 March 1903 – 21 March 1964) was an ethnic German ice hockey player from Czechoslovakia. On international stage, Dorasil represented Czechoslovakia at world and European championships. He also competed in the men's tournament at the 1928 Winter Olympics.

Dorasil graduated from a gymnasium in Opava, eventually moving to Munich to study economic sciences at the polytechnic there. However after finishing just three semesters, he was expelled from the school for participating in Hitler's Beer Hall Putsch in 1923. After returning to Opava, he dedicated his time fully to ice hockey. He played in total 38 games for Czechoslovakia between 1927-1932, scoring 10 goals.

In 1933 he married Erika Reineck, with whom he had two sons. Already before World War II, Dorasil became active in German nationalist organizations, DNSAP and later NSKK and NSDAP. After the war he was arrested and interred in an internment camp for ethnic Germans, before being expelled to Germany. After he died, his remains were moved from Germany to be laid to rest in Opava, following his wishes.

References

External links
 

1903 births
1964 deaths
Czech ice hockey defencemen
Ice hockey players at the 1928 Winter Olympics
Olympic ice hockey players of Czechoslovakia
Sportspeople from Opava
Silesian-German people
Nazi Party members
National Socialist Motor Corps members
Czechoslovak ice hockey defencemen
Czechoslovak emigrants to West Germany
Prisoners and detainees of Czechoslovakia